Evgeniy Timofeev (born October 16, 1994 in Bishkek, Kyrgyzstan) is an alpine skier from Kyrgyzstan. He competed for Kyrgyzstan at the 2014 Winter Olympics in the slalom and giant slalom. He was the only Kyrgyzstani athlete in Sochi.

Timofeev was not selected for the team. Alpine skier Dmitry Trelevski was selected as the only athlete, however on February 12 during training runs Trelevski was injured seriously, that he had to withdraw from the competition. The National Olympic Committee replaced Dmitry Trelevski with Evgeniy Timofeev after petitioning the International Olympic Committee.

In January 2017, Timofeev was named to Kyrgyzstan's 2017 Asian Winter Games team.

In February 2018, Timofeev again represented Kyrgyzstan in the Pyeongchang Winter Olympics, racing the Giant Slalom.

References

External links
 

1994 births
Living people
Olympic alpine skiers of Kyrgyzstan
Alpine skiers at the 2014 Winter Olympics
Alpine skiers at the 2018 Winter Olympics
Sportspeople from Bishkek
Kyrgyzstani people of Russian descent
Kyrgyzstani male alpine skiers
Alpine skiers at the 2017 Asian Winter Games